Malšice is a market town in Tábor District in the South Bohemian Region of the Czech Republic. It has about 1,800 inhabitants.

Administrative parts
Villages of Čenkov, Dobřejice, Maršov, Nové Lány, Obora, Staré Lány, Třebelice and Všechlapy are administrative parts of Všemyslice.

Geography
It lies in the Tábor Uplands. The Lužnice River forms two sections of the municipal border in the west and north.

History

The first written mention of Malšice is from 1279. It 1868, the village was promoted to a market town. The title, which was canceled in 1954, was returned to Malšice in 2008.

Sights
The main landmark of Malšice is the Church of the Holy Trinity. It was originally a Gothic church from 1373. In 1743–1745, it was rebuilt in the Baroque style.

Notable people
Miroslav Kříženecký (born 1946), lawyer and politician

References

External links

Populated places in Tábor District
Market towns in the Czech Republic